Antiprogestogens, or antiprogestins, also known as progesterone antagonists or progesterone blockers, are a class of drugs which prevent progestogens like progesterone from mediating their biological effects in the body. They act by blocking the progesterone receptor (PR) and/or inhibiting or suppressing progestogen production. Antiprogestogens are one of three types of sex hormone antagonists, the others being antiestrogens and antiandrogens.

Antiprogestogens are used as abortifacients and emergency contraceptives and in the treatment of uterine fibroids. They are also being studied in the treatment of breast cancer. Examples of antiprogestogens include the progesterone receptor weak partial agonist mifepristone, the selective progesterone receptor modulator (SPRM) ulipristal acetate, and the silent antagonist aglepristone. For medical abortion, mifepristone is combined with a prostaglandin (e.g., gemeprost).

Several hundred antiprogestogens have been developed, but only three, mifepristone, lilopristone, and onapristone, have been given to humans, and of these, only mifepristone has been approved and introduced for clinical use.

See also
Antiestrogen
Antiandrogen

References

External links

Antiprogestin entry in the public domain NCI Dictionary of Cancer Terms